The Nicaragua Under 20s football team, more commonly known as La Azulita, is controlled by Nicaraguan Football Federation and represents Nicaragua in international Under 20 or youth football competitions.

Competitive record

FIFA U-20 World Cup Record

UNCAF preliminary round

CONCACAF Under-20 Championship

Fixtures and results

Current squad

 The following players were called up for the 2022 CONCACAF U-20 Championship.
 Match dates: 18 June – 3 July 2022
 Caps and goals correct as of: 25 June 2022
 Names in italics denote players who have been capped for the senior team.

Current technical staff
 Head coach:  Jaime Ruiz
 Assistant coach:  Tyron Acevedo
 Goalkeeper coach:  Carlos Mendieta
 Doctor: Curpertino Borrell

References

External links
FENIFUT – Nicaraguan Football Federation

under-20